Marrying the Mafia IV is a 2011 South Korean film and the fourth installment of Marrying the Mafia series.

Plot
Hong Deok-Ja continues to run a kimchi food company and leaves for Japan on a business trip with three sons. However, when bank robbers steals their money, the family is separated from their guide, and a misunderstanding between language barriers makes the White Tiger family think that they are wanted by the cops.

Cast
 Kim Soo-mi as Hong Deok-Ja
 Shin Hyun-joon as Jang In-Jae
 Tak Jae-hoon as Jang Seok-Jae
 Im Hyung-joon as Jang Kyung-Jae
 Jeong Jun-ha as Jong-Myeon
 Hyun Young as Hyo-Jung
 Kim Ji-woo as Mori
 Jung Woong-in as Hyun-Joon
 Jung Man-sik
 Yuko Fueki as Japanese announcer (cameo)

See also
 Marrying the Mafia
 Marrying the Mafia II
 Marrying the Mafia III
 Marrying the Mafia V

External links
 

2010s crime comedy films
Films about organized crime in South Korea
Next Entertainment World films
2010s Korean-language films
South Korean crime comedy films
South Korean sequel films
2010s South Korean films